Csilla Madarász-Bajnogel-Dobai (23 June 1943 – 31 December 2021) was a Hungarian swimmer who won a bronze medal in the 4 × 100 m freestyle relay at the 1962 European Aquatics Championships. She competed in the 100 m freestyle, 4 × 100 m freestyle and 4 × 100 m medley events at the 1960 and 1964 Summer Olympics and finished fourth-sixth in all events, except for one relay where her team was disqualified for improper changeover. She was born Csilla Madarász, but changed her last name twice due to marriages. Madarász died on 31 December 2021, at the age of 78.

References

External links
 

1943 births
2021 deaths
Swimmers at the 1960 Summer Olympics
Swimmers at the 1964 Summer Olympics
Olympic swimmers of Hungary
Hungarian female swimmers
European Aquatics Championships medalists in swimming
Hungarian female freestyle swimmers
Universiade medalists in swimming
Universiade gold medalists for Hungary
Medalists at the 1963 Summer Universiade
Medalists at the 1965 Summer Universiade
Sportspeople from Budapest
20th-century Hungarian women
21st-century Hungarian women